Edward Dahlberg (July 22, 1900 – February 27, 1977) was an American novelist, essayist, and autobiographer.

Background
Edward Dahlberg was born in Boston, Massachusetts, to Elizabeth Dahlberg. Together, mother and son led a vagabond existence until 1905 when she operated the Star Lady Barbershop in Kansas City. Edward was sent to a Catholic orphanage in Kansas City at the age of six for one year. In April 1912, Dahlberg was sent to the Jewish Orphan Asylum in Cleveland, Ohio, where he lived until 1917. He eventually attended the University of California, Berkeley (1922–23) and Columbia University (B.S. in philosophy. 1925).

Career
Dahlberg enlisted in the U.S. Army during World War I, in which he lost the use of an eye after being struck with a rifle butt. In the late 1920s, Dahlberg became part of the expatriate group of American writers living in Paris. His first novel, Bottom Dogs, was based on his childhood experiences at the orphanage and his travels in the American West; it was published in London with an introduction by D. H. Lawrence. With his advance money, Dahlberg returned to New York City and resided in Greenwich Village. In 1933 he visited Germany, where he wrote anti-Nazi articles for The Times and counseled many German intellectuals, Jews, communists and anarchists to flee Germany. In 1934 he published the first American anti-Nazi novel, Those Who Perish.  From the 1940s onwards, Dahlberg made his living as an author and also taught at various colleges and universities.  From 1944-1948 he taught at Boston University. In 1948, he taught briefly at the experimental Black Mountain College. He was replaced on the staff by his friend and fellow author, Charles Olson.

During his years as an expatriate writer in 1920s Paris, he knew James Joyce, Samuel Beckett, Sean O'Casey, Ernest Hemingway, F. Scott Fitzgerald, T.S. Eliot, Ezra Pound, Yeats, D.H. Lawrence and many others.  A proletarian novelist of the 1930s, a spokesman for a fundamental humanism in the 1940s, he was an important member and editor for the Stieglitz Group, which promoted human rights all over the world. He spoke out against the mistreatment of African Americans, Indigenous Americans (Native Americans), Jews, immigrants, and workers. He was jailed three or four times for standing up to inhumanity. For a number of years, Dahlberg devoted himself to literary study. His extensive readings of the works of Dante, Shakespeare, Thoreau, and many others resulted in a writing style quite different from the social realism that characterized his earlier writing.

He moved to the Danish island of Bornholm in 1955 while working on The Flea of Sodom. The Sorrows of Priapus was published in 1957, becoming his most successful book thus far. He later moved to Sóller, on Mallorca, while working on Because I Was Flesh, an autobiography which was published in 1964. During the 1960s and 1970s, he became quite prolific and further refined his unique style through the publication of poetry, autobiographical works, fiction and criticism. He also lived in Dublin and Wicklow, London, Madrid, Malaga, Mexico City and the Seychelles.

Personal life
In 1942 he married Winifred Donlea O'Carroll. Winifred had two children from her previous marriage to the writer and professor Harry Thornton Moore. Edward and Winifred had two children together. His second marriage was to R'lene LaFleur Howell and his third, in 1968, to his longtime mistress, Julia Lawlor. Edward, R'lene, and Julia lived in Dublin from the early 1960s to the early 1970s where Edward was a member of an Irish literary group that met at McDaid's Pub near Trinity College, Dublin. Members of this group included Frank O'Connor, Brendan and Dominic Behan, Patrick Kavanagh, James Liddy, Garech Browne, Patrick Galvin and occasionally Frank McCourt and many others, with music often provided by The Dubliners. In 1968, he was elected to the National Institute of Arts and Letters. In 1976, he was awarded a Guggenheim Fellowship. Dahlberg died in Santa Barbara, California, on February 27, 1977.

Selected works
 1929 – Bottom Dogs
 1932 – From Flushing to Calvary
 1934 – Those Who Perish
 1941 – Do These Bones Live, essays
 1947 – Sing O Barren, revision of Do These Bones Live
 1950 – Flea of Sodom, essays and parables
 1957 – The Sorrows of Priapus
 1960 – Can These Bones Live, second revision of Do These Bones Live
 1961 – Truth Is More Sacred with Sir Herbert Read
 1964 – Because I Was Flesh, autobiography
 1964 – Alms for Oblivion, essays and reminiscences
 1965 – Reasons of the Heart: Maxims
 1966 – Cipango’s Hinder Door, poems
 1967 – The Dahlberg Reader
 1967 – Epitaphs of Our Times, letters
 1967 – The Leafless American, miscellany
 1968 – The Carnal Myth: A Search Into Classical Sensuality
 1971 – The Confessions of Edward Dahlberg, autobiography and fiction
 1972 – The Gold of Ophir: Travels, myths, and legends in the New World
 1976 – The Olive of Minerva: Or, The Comedy of a Cuckold
 1989 – Samuel Beckett's Wake & Other Uncollected Prose

Legacy
Dahlberg is the subject of the title essay for Jonathan Lethem's The Disappointment Artist, a 2006 essay collection.

References

Other sources
Billings, Harold A Bibliography of Edward Dahlberg (Harry Ransom Humanities; 1971) 
Moramarco, Fred S. Edward Dahlberg (Twayne Publishing. 1972) 
DeFanti, Charles The Wages of Expectation: A Biography of Edward Dahlberg (New York University Press.  1978) 
Lethem, Jonathan The Disappointment Artist (Doubleday: 2005) 
Solomon, William, Literature, Amusement, and Technology in the Great Depression (Cambridge University Press: 2002)

External links
Edward Dahlberg Collection at the Harry Ransom Humanities Research Center at the University of Texas at Austin
Guide to the Edward Dahlberg Papers at Stanford University
University of Tulsa McFarlin Library's inventory of Edward Dahlberg papers
Edward Dahlberg quotes

1900 births
1977 deaths
20th-century American novelists
American male novelists
American male essayists
20th-century American essayists
Proletarian literature
University of California, Berkeley alumni
Columbia College (New York) alumni
Members of the Communist Party USA
20th-century American male writers
Members of the American Academy of Arts and Letters